Mal Paharia may refer to:
the Mal Paharia people
the Mal Paharia language